Tower Poetry is an organisation affiliated with Christ Church, Oxford that aims to promote the reading and writing of poetry in young people. The group is funded by a donation from the late Christopher Tower, and run by Oxford University lecturer Peter McDonald.

It publishes the magazine Poetry Matters, which holds news and reviews as well as original poetry. It also runs the Christopher Tower Poetry Prizes, which awards cash prizes to the best poems submitted by young people on a specified theme, and the annual Christopher Tower Summer School.The Summer School is an annual three-day course for 18- to 23-year-olds, held at Christ Church.

Christopher Tower Poetry Prizes 
The Christopher Tower Poetry Prizes are annual prizes awarded to young British poets between the ages of 16 and 18, for poems submitted on a set theme.  The prizes are administered by Christ Church, Oxford, and are funded by a bequest by the late Christopher Tower.  Since their launch in 2000, the prizes have become recognised as one of the United Kingdom's most prestigious poetry awards for young writers. Several past winners and runners-up have gone on to win other major poetry competitions, such as the Eric Gregory Award, and to publish collections.

Past winners and runners-up

References

External links 
 http://www.poetrylibrary.org.uk
 Tower Poetry website.
 Tower Poetry Twitter.
 Tower Poetry Instagram.

British poetry awards
Organisations based in Oxfordshire